Leonardo Colucci (born 29 December 1972) is an Italian football coach and former player, who played as a midfielder. He was most recently head coach of Serie C club Juve Stabia.

Playing career

Early career
Colucci started his career at his hometown club Cerignola, where he played in the regional Italian league divisions (Serie D and Interregionale). In the 1993–94 season, he signed for Siracusa of Serie C1. His performances for the club led to him being signed by Serie A side Lazio halfway through the 1994–95 season; he scored the winning and only goal in the last match of the season, against Brescia.

In the 1995–96 season, he left for Reggiana of Serie B. He played 35 league matches, out of a possible 38.

Verona
In the next season he played for Verona of Serie A. After the club were relegated in 1997, he won the Serie B Champion in 1999, helping the team return to Serie A.

He spent another three seasons in Serie A with Verona until they were relegated again in 2002.

Bologna
In July 2002, he left for Bologna. He played 85 league matches over three Serie A seasons, and followed the team as they were relegated to Serie B in 2005.

Late career
In August 2006, he joined Cagliari of Serie A. He made 23 starts for the club and 26 league appearances overall. In the summer of 2007, he left for Cremonese of Serie C1.

In September 2009, he joined Modena of Serie B on a free transfer. He remained with the club until 2011, when he retired from professional football to pursue a coaching career.

Coaching career
On 14 February 2018, he was fired as the coach of Serie C club Pordenone.

On 17 November 2020, he was hired by Serie C club Ravenna.

On 15 November 2021, he was announced as the new head coach of Serie C club Picerno. After guiding them to a spot in the promotion playoff, where they were eliminated in the first round, on 14 May 2022 Picerno announced they would not extend Colucci's contract with the club.

In June 2022, Colucci agreed a deal with Serie C club Juve Stabia as their new head coach. He resigned on 27 January 2023 due to personal reasons.

Honours

Player
Verona
Serie B: 1998–99

References

External links
Gazzetta dello Sport profile 

Italian footballers
S.S. Lazio players
A.C. Reggiana 1919 players
Hellas Verona F.C. players
Bologna F.C. 1909 players
Cagliari Calcio players
U.S. Cremonese players
Modena F.C. players
Serie A players
Serie B players
Serie C players
Association football midfielders
People from Cerignola
1972 births
Footballers from Apulia
Sportspeople from the Province of Foggia
Living people
Italian football managers
A.C. Reggiana 1919 managers
Pordenone Calcio managers
Ravenna F.C. managers
Serie C managers
S.S. Juve Stabia managers